Autobiography in Blues is an album by the blues musician Lightnin' Hopkins, recorded in 1959 and released on the Tradition label the following year.

Reception

AllMusic stated: "Not having recorded commercially for several years, Lightnin' was in serious mood, resulting in a set of masterful performances that carried more weight than his later, frequently arbitrary sessions". The Penguin Guide to Blues Recordings awarded the album 3 stars, calling it a "satisfying example of Lightnin' in a private setting" and noting that "the recording lends warmth to both voice and acoustic guitar".

Track listing
All compositions by Sam "Lightnin'" Hopkins and Mack McCormick except where noted
 "In the Evening, the Sun Is Going Down" – 4:13
 "Trouble in Mind" (Richard M. Jones) – 2:53
 "Mama and Papa Hopkins" – 4:42
 "The Foot Race Is On" – 2:42
 "That Gambling Life" – 4:52
 "When the Saints Go Marching In" (Traditional) – 2:44
 "Get off My Toe" – 4:59
 "75 Highway" – 4:10
 "Bottle It up and Go" – 3:42
 "Short Haired Woman" – 3:38
 "So Long Baby" – 1:47
 "Santa Fe Blues" – 3:11

Personnel

Performance
Lightnin' Hopkins – guitar, vocals

Production
 Mack McCormick – supervision, engineer

References

Lightnin' Hopkins albums
1960 albums
Tradition Records albums